Anada is a rural locality (a selo) in Khidibsky Selsoviet, Tlyaratinsky District, Republic of Dagestan, Russia. The population was 49 as of 2010.

Geography 
Anada is located 19 km north of Tlyarata (the district's administrative centre) by road. Tlobzoda is the nearest rural locality.

References 

Rural localities in Tlyaratinsky District